Maebongsan is a mountain of North Korea. It has an elevation of 1,578 metres. It stands in the middle of Poptong County in Kangwon Province.

See also
List of mountains of Korea

References

Mountains of North Korea